Kienlongbank Kiên Giang Football Club is a Vietnamese professional football club, based in Rạch Giá, Kiên Giang Province, that plays in the V-League. Founded as Nguyễn Hoàng Kiên Giang before changing its name after the team was sold to Kien Long Bank. The club plays its home games at Rạch Giá Stadium.

Kienlongbank Kiên Giang were runners-up to Sài Gòn Xuân Thành in the 2011 Vietnamese First Division and are promoted to the Super League for the 2012 season.

Stadium
Kienlongbank Kiên Giang's home is Rạch Giá Stadium in Rạch Giá. The stadium has a capacity of 5,000 people.

Current squad

'As April 2019''

Achievements

National competitions
League
V.League 2:
 Runners-up : 2011
Second League:
 Winners : 2010

References

External links

Association football clubs established in 1998
Football clubs in Vietnam
1998 establishments in Vietnam